The  (Nomocanon of Saint Sava, m,  or ), was the highest code in the Serbian Orthodox Church. It was finished in 1219. This legal act was written in simple language. Its basic purpose was to organize the continuation and functioning of the Serbian Kingdom and the Serbian Church. It was originally printed under the name Rules of Speech in Serbian at Raška, Serbia, in two successive issues, one for Wallachia and another for Transylvania (in 1640). It is Serbia's first Serbian-language church-state constitution.

Byzantine nomocanons
The first mention of a similar church codex was the 451 Synopsis of Stephen of Ephesus, in relation to decisions made in the Council of Chalcedon. This codex includes a rules synopsis. It is believed that this codex was written by Stephen of Ephesus.

John Scholasticus, the Patriarch of Constantinople, was the writer of the first church-civil codex in which the material is systematically arranged. The twelve Novellae of Emperor Justinian (Novellae Constitutiones) on the subject of church and law are a part of this codex. It is known as the Nomocanon of John Scholasticus (ca. 550) or the Syntagma of John Scholasticus. Syntagmas are nomocanons that contain rules without explanations. 

At the beginning of the seventh century, two important acts were combined. The Canon Syntagma, written by Patriarch Sergius, and a codex written as a part of Justinian's law, by an unknown author, were taken by a jurist named Julian who turned them into Nomocanon in 14.Titles. In 883, the rules from the Trullan and Second Council of Nicaea, those written at the Constantinopolitan assemblies, and at civil assemblies were added to the nomocanon. Patriarch Photios wrote the foreword. In 920, the Nomocanon of Photios was proclaimed an official law document of the Christian Church by the four eastern patriarchs at their council in Constantinople.

Nomocanon of Methodius
The first Slavic nomocanon, was probably written by Slavic enlightener Methodius around 868. It was most likely written by Leo III or Constantine V as a short version of Justinian's codex. Methodius's nomocanon was written just before he traveled to Slavs in Lower Pannonia to visit Prince Kocel (869–870 and 873–874) and it applied to all Slavs.

Contents

The Zakonopravilo consists of seven introductory chapters:

 A word about seven ecumenical councils
 Interpretation of the line that follows: "Jesus Christ, have mercy on us."
 Interpretation of the Nicene Creed: "We believe in one God, the Father Almighty, Maker of all things visible and invisible."
 Interpretation of the prayer which the Lord Jesus Christ taught the apostles, and us along with them, with which to pray, saying :"Our Father who art in heaven."
 Prologue of those who reduced the sacred rules to 14 branches
 Nomocanon in 14 Titles
 The introduction to the Nomocanon

followed by sixty-three other chapters:

 The rules of the apostles and church fathers along with the interpretation of Alexius Aristinos
 The rules of Saint Paul
 The rules of both Saints Peter and Paul
 The rules of all saints apostles
 Decisions and rules of the First Ecumenical Council
 The rules of the holy Synod of Ancyra
 The rules of the holy Synod of Neo-Caesarea
 The rules of the holy Synod of Gangra
 The rules of the holy Synod of Antioch
 The rules of the holy Synod of Laodicea
 Decisions and rules of the Second Ecumenical Council
 Decisions and rules of the Third Ecumenical Council
 Decisions and rules of the Fourth Ecumenical Council
 The rules of the holy Synod of Sardica
 The rules of the holy Synod of Carthage
 Memoirs transacted in Constantinople concerning Agapius and Gabadius
 Decisions and rules of the Sixth Ecumenical Council
 Decisions and rules of the Seventh Ecumenical Council
 The rules of the First and Second Councils, held in Constantinople, in the Church of the Holy Apostles
 The three rules of the council in the Church of Hagia Sophia in Constantinople
 The rules from the epistles of Saint Basil the Great addressed to Amphilochius, Diodorus, and others
 26 rules of Saint Basil the Great about time for sinning
 The rules of Saint Basil the Great about the size and looks of the places for those who do penance
 A lesson about the divine service, Holy Communion, and those who take care of those who do penance, which Basil the Great dedicated to the presbyter
 A letter by Basil the Great to Gregory of Nazianzus about the establishment of monks
 The rules from the epistle of Saint Tarasios to the Roman Pope Adrian I, forbidding payment for ordination
 The rules of Saint Dionysius
 The rules of Saint Peter
 The rules of Saint Gregory Thaumaturgus
 The rules of Athanasius the Great
 The rules from the epistle of Athanasius the Great to Bishop Ruphinianus
 The rules from the speech of Saint Gregory of Nazianzus
 The rules of Saint Gregory of Nyssa
 The rules of Saint Timothy
 Theophilus' explanation of Epiphany when it falls on a Sunday
 The rules from the Epistle of Saint Cyril to Nestorius
 Cyril's rules about orthodoxy, 12 chapters against Nestorius
 The rules from the epistle of Saint Gennadius
 The rules from the epistle of the council in Constantinople to Marthiruius, bishop of Antioch, about how to accept heretics who approach the Cathedral
 Chapters of the great church, Hagia Sophia, sealed with Justinian's golden stamp, about slaves who seek refuge in the church
 The rules of Dimitrios, metropolitan of Cyzicus
 The rules about the Bogomils
 The epistle of archbishop Peter, Antiochian Venetian archbishop
 The epistle of Beatified Chernorizets Nilus to presbyter Haricles
 Codex of John Scholasticus in 87 chapters
 Novella of a pious man, Alexius I Comnenus
 A branch of Emperor Justinian's novellae
 Regulations of Moses' legislation
 The epistles of monk Niketas against the Latins, dispraise for introducing fasting on Saturdays
 The same as 49, dispraise for introducing celibate for the clergy
 The same as 50, about French and other Latins
 The same as 51.
 The same as 52.
 The same as 53.
 Translation of the Proheiron
 The rules about forbidden and permitted marriages
 The same as 56.
 The same as 57.
 The same as 58.
 The same as 59.
 Articles about heresy
 The same as 61.
 The same as 62.

Social justice

 is famous for its advanced treatment of social justice. Saint Sava expanded the boundaries of social justice, confronting the norms of Byzantine civil law and slave society. He accentuated the Christian teaching of social justice, justifying it by saying that norms should serve a man and not the public interest. 

One of the most significant social justice rules is introduced in the fourth introductory chapter. This chapter was taken from Saint John Chrysostom's interpretation of Our Father and it states: "Because he didn't say My father but Our father.... Nobody should worry only about themselves, but also about their neighbours, and nobody should have more than the other: neither the rich from the poor, neither the lord from the servant, neither a prince from those over which he rules, neither a tsar from the soldier, neither the wisest from the unlearned, because to all he gave one gratitude." This regulation proclaimed the equality of all people regardless of their financial or social status, it forbade allow oppression, and it strove for welfare. It was contrary to the principles of slave society at the time.

Shelter of the poor and the role of noble homes
Shelter of the poor and the role of noble homes is mentioned in chapter 48, in the section "On court and justice", which was taken from Leviticus and Deuteronomy. Sava wanted to emphasize philanthropy, in particular that laws should be interpreted in a way that encourages philanthropy. Shelter and assistance for the most endangered (the poor) was defined as ethical and just, while glorifying the rich and powerful was unethical and unacceptable. The people and institutions that are most likely to be asked to provide care for the weak are bishops, deacons and presbyters (basically the church as an institution).  contains two canons that speak on this:

59: the Apostles' canon imposes excommunication for bishops or presbyters who do not give a poor cleric what he is in need of, and takes away their rank if they remain merciless (because they are murderers of their own brother)

7: the canon from Synod of Sardica includes the poor and those who are unprotected from violence. They can seek help from a bishop, who is obliged to assist them as much as he can or they can go to the emperor personally and ask for help.

Bishops, busy with their church duties, were unable to protect the many powerless people from abusers and famine. The solution was to establish services that church representatives (ecdics) chosen by the emperor would carry out. Ecdics were executors of the church and a sort of judge, because they were expected to defend the interests of the church in the courtroom. However, some ecdics were responsible for more than church issues. This is known from some tsar's decrees, for instance: Emperor Theodosius I wrote to Constantinople's ecdic saying he should not let peasants and citizens be oppressed by taxes, that he should repress the arrogance of archonts and care for his people as he does his children. Because of the importance of this role, laws were created to regulate the elections of ecdics, with the participation of respectable citizens and led by bishop and clergy.

Proheiron defines who is considered poor: "the one who has less than 50 gold coins in his belongings is poor."

One of the most important ways of protecting the poor is the building of noble homes (churches, monasteries, hospices, public kitchens, residences of the impoverished, hospitals). Regulations referring to noble homes are mostly taken from John Scholasticus' Canon in 87 chapters or Justinian's Novellae. They include:

 If the testator informs in writing that he desires to found a noble home, a bishop or a head of that area is obliged to perform that duty within a five-year period and to do as the testator specifies in his will (for instance, selecting administrators he finds suitable).
 Possessions inherited by the church are used for feeding the poor.
 Those who ask to receive their possessions back after they have designated them for feeding the poor are never to be forgiven.

Noble homes could be leased but only under strict surveillance, so malpractice and damage infliction are avoided. A lease could be granted for an unlimited term. Ways of making a lease contract were specified, for example by having the administrative staff of the noble home swear an oath in front of a bishop promising no damage would be caused.

Responsibilities of parents and children

The responsibilities of parents and children comprise another important section. The author strived to highlight the importance of families, in which life evolves and social awareness awakens. He believed that respecting one's parents is one of the greatest family values. This is why those who disrespected and abused their mothers or fathers were punished severely – with the death penalty. The  prescribes a milder punishment – those who are guilty shall be disinherited.
In case of sickness, children also have obligations to their parents. If parents are mentally or physically ill and their children refuse to look after them, then they, as legal heirs, could be disinherited. Children have one more obligation concerning inheritance law. They should not disinherit their parents or alienate their property which could be bequeathed – it is strictly forbidden in all but the following situations: when parents give up their children for execution, when parents practice witchcraft to harm their children, when a father seduces his son's wife or concubine or when parents endanger each other.
Children who abandon their parents and excuse themselves with nothing but piety while showing no respect, will be doomed, and vice versa (for parents who abandon their children before adulthood). Certain civil regulations were influenced by these canon norms. Parents are not allowed to disinherit their children nor children to disinherit their parents when leaving for the monastery, if the motive for disinheriting appeared before the monastic life.   also regulates the way the property of those who enter the monastic life should be divided. If a monk has children, he can bequeath his property before or after leaving for the monastery so his children are provided with an inheritance. If he dies before making a will, his children are to take what is legally theirs while the rest of the property is given to the monastery.  lays down the rules of inheritance for children whose father (if he did not live in the monastery) died and who now live with a poor mother or mother in law. In this case, if  has three children or less, the wife gets a quarter of the property, whether the children are hers or from the previous marriage. If he has more than three children, then the wife gets just as much as one child gets for use (owners of that property are their own children).

The old, the powerless and those with physical deformities
Saint Sava paid attention to the old, the powerless and to those with physical deformities too. Since ageing usually comes along with disease and weakness, the author's aim was to provide respect and legal protection for this category of people.
That is why in the chapter 48 of  under the "about respecting the graybeards" heading there is to be found a regulation from the books of Moses:
"Before the face of the gray-haired stand up and respect the face of the old."

Saint Sava wrote an interpretation of the whole canon, including Aristinos' comments, regarding this topic. He also added that:
"If any clergyman imitates or ridicules the blind, the deaf or the lame, or those crippled in any other way – he shall be deposed because he is an offense to God who created him."

Another way to protect these people was to give them the opportunity for inheritance. Besides this, the only way for their relatives to include them as heirs is to manage their property during their lifetimes. Also, the law dictates that the blind can name their own heir verbally, by having seven or five witnesses present.

The position of women

The position of women actually represents one of the most important indicators of social awareness in society. Roman marriage law enables a relatively easy divorce by written statement or by an agreement. Byzantine marriage law had difficulty in freeing itself from its Roman heritage, until Emperor Justinian made important limitations to the novellae in 542, which were later transferred to the Nomocanon in 14 titles (47th chapter of ). With this law the marital security of women was also strengthened in both families of priests and secular families. When it comes to families of priests,  dictates that if a presbyter or a deacon banishes his wife (for example by excusing himself with piety) and decides not to take her back, his title will be taken away. The rule in secular families is that if a man leaves his wife for any reason other than those regulated by law and weds another, he will be denied holy communion, while a woman who leaves her husband will be cursed. The only legitimate reason for a divorce, according to canonical teaching, is adultery. Nevertheless, Saint Sava could not stay within the boundaries of church teaching when it came to reasons for divorce. He prescribes part of a novella written by Emperor Leo VI the Wise which states that if a man has an insane wife who does not recover within three years, he has the right to divorce her. After that, in the 11th chapter of Proheiron is a list of reasons for which a woman can request a divorce: if the husband is working against the state or knows anyone else that might be without revealing it, if he does anything to harm the wife in any way, or if he forces her to be unfaithful. For a divorce to happen, in the case of the wife committing adultery, doubt alone is not enough but proof is needed. If it is determined that the wife was in fact unfaithful, the husband gets the premarital gift and the dowry, but if its proven otherwise the woman can get a divorce and take her dowry and premarital gift back. If they had no children the woman also has the right to her husband's possessions worth up to a third of the premarital gift. In the case of the husband being unfaithful, the woman can choose not to leave her husband if he stops living with another woman after his wife requests it. If a slave was involved in the adultery, the punishments are a little bit more rigorous:

When the husband commits adultery with a slave the act will be revealed to the public, the husband will be punished by beating and the slave will be sold to another region.
 
When a married woman commits adultery with her slave, she will get punished by beating, cutting her hair, cutting off her nose, banishing and confiscating her belongings and the slave is punished by the sword.

The difference in punishment for men and women for the same act of deviancy is quite apparent. Nevertheless, there are situations in which they will be punished equally – when a man puts the woman's life at risk, or the other way around, the crime will be revealed to the public and immediate retaliation is requested.

According to the church, widows and poor women were the most socially endangered group so they were accordingly given the most protection. An article was carried over from Book of Exodus to  stating: "You must not mistreat any widow or orphan. If you do mistreat them, and they cry out to Me in distress, I will surely hear their cry. My anger will be kindled, and I will kill you with the sword; then your wives will become widows and your children will be fatherless". The first way of protecting a widow is the inheritance she will get (if her deceased husband has up to three children), which is one fourth of the husband's assets, which can not be over 100 liters of gold. The second way is that the church is obliged to feed and take care of the widow if she were to request it.

Just like the widows, poor women were also protected. According to the book of tsar, a person that defamed a virgin will get their nose cut off and will be obliged to give a third of all their assets to the woman in question. The Proheiron states that if a person were to have a relationship with a girl younger than 13, that person would have their nose cut off, and will be obliged to give half of all their assets to the girl in question. If a person were to abduct an engaged woman, they would be obliged to give her back to her fiancée, and if they were to abduct a woman that was not engaged, they would be obliged to give her back to her family (parents, guardians, brothers, etc.), which would later decide if she was to marry her captor. This regulation was adopted at the Synod of Ancyra. Saint Basil later made some significant changes to this regulation with the 22nd cannon. However, the book of tsar  and the Proheiron were not in agreement with the idea of a woman marrying her captor, they even strictly forbid it (according to the Proheiron, a parent that wishes his daughter to marry her captor will be imprisoned). Civil legislation in the Proheiron states the following in the case of a person defiling a woman with her consent, but without the consent of her parents: If the woman is not engaged, the man who defiled her can marry her if he chooses to do so, but only with the consent of her parents. If the parents do not consent, and the man is wealthy, he is obliged to give the woman a liter of gold. If the man is poor, he is obliged to give the woman half of his property. If the man is disabled, he is to be beaten and banished. In the case of the woman being engaged there are two possibilities. If the woman consented the man will be punished by getting his nose cut off. If the woman did not consent, apart from getting his nose cut off, the man will also be obliged to give her a third of his property.

In the case of poor women,  protects them with the following articles:

Marriage between a guardian (and his closest relatives) and a poor woman is forbidden, so that she can protect herself from abuse by her carers.

If moribund parents appoint a guardian for their daughter, he can not marry her off or abrogate a previous marriage without her consent.

Captives, exiles and prisoners
Prisoners were considered the most socially endangered of all because in exchange for their freedom even censers were allowed for sale. The importance of freeing prisoners is represented in one specific regulation that says that monks who, when leaving the monastery, ask to have their possessions back even though they were used to release prisoners, will never be forgiven. Anyone could bequeath their property to prisoners for the sake of their release. Prisoners' heirs (especially children) are bound by the law to use the heritage in order to help the prisoner make free. If not, the church shall take away the property and use it with that purpose. If children are to neglect their imprisoned parents, and they manage to free themselves, they have the right to choose whether children will become a part of their will or not. If they fail to free themselves or die while in captivity because of their children's neglect, the children shall be disinherited and the property will be given to the church with the aim of paying ransom for others. The same is the case with relatives who are named as heirs. 
When a child is taken to captivity, the parents' obligations are not much different. Parents are disinherited if their child dies in captivity because of their neglect. In the aim of releasing captives it was allowed for anyone (older than 18) to take gold as a loan and pawn his own or prisoner's belongings. A male minor is not obliged to have a custodian if his father is held captive, but he needs to have a property guardian. After the father is released the son is back in his power.
A woman could also be held in custody and if someone were to pay her ransom she would become his wife and their children would be legitimate. A dying soldier is also considered socially endangered. If a soldier realizes his end is near he can bequeath his property in front of two witnesses and his will be accepted as valid. Exiles and captives were also considered socially endangered. A woman could also sell her dowry in order to feed her exiled father, brother or husband. Those who were captivated temporarily did not lose their inheritance rights.

Slaves
Many regulations of  represent a great contrast between the slave society and Christian teaching. Christian teaching proclaims the freedom and equality of all, including both slaves and masters. However, slavery was so deeply rooted that it took a couple of centuries for people to start perceiving slaves as more than things. Also, a person is either born a slave or becomes a slave (in captivity) and all slaves are equal – nobody is more or less of a slave. On the one hand, slaves could be tortured by masters but on the other hand, the greatest punishment would ensue for the slave that tries to endanger his master's life. A master could be convicted if he tortures his slave for a long time before killing him, but if he murders him without torture he will get away with no punishment. Two rules were taken from Moses' legislation:
 A master who murders a slave by his own hand is to be punished
 A slave has monetary value
 
Because of the second rule, it is worse to hit a slave than to hit a freeman. Both master and slave benefit from this – the master makes a profit from it and the slave is protected from injuries that would cause his price to drop.  More favorable are church regulations. Masters are mentioned in a mindful way so their anger towards the slaves would be reduced, while slaves are not encouraged to rebel or slaughter. Instead they are asked to be loyal and serve their masters in order to make them more willing to grant freedom. 
Slaves could be named as priests only with their master's consent and if it was given to them they would be set free. If it was not, and if the slave decided to leave the church and start living a worldly life, a master was allowed to regain power over him for a one-year period. The master's consent was also necessary when a slave wanted to become a monk. Those who encouraged slaves to leave their masters, excusing themselves with piety, would be convicted and the slaves who did so would be doomed. This regulation shows how careful and strict slave society was when it comes to releasing slaves, but also when it comes to protecting the real and pure significance of piety. For a very long time, freeing the slaves was possible only in the emperor's chambers until the Synod of Carthage where "the fathers of the synod" asked the emperor to allow slaves to also be freed in churches. The next regulation in which whom slaves were protected states that when a master frees his slave before two witnesses, the slave can no longer be enslaved by anyone.
 
1. If a freeman is enslaved and he turns to church, his master will be invited and if he does not come than the slave will be freed.
 
2. If a master or someone else tortures the slave with hunger or nudity, and the master does nothing to stop it, the slave must be sold to somebody else so he would not die from hunger.
 
3. Not related to slaves.
 
4. If a slave resorts to church for no reason, he will be punished and returned to his master.
 
5. If a slave asks for the master to come and take him home himself, and the master sends a representative instead, in that way disobeying the slave's wishes, the church is obliged to hand over the slave nevertheless (for instance, to the lord's most loyal servant).
 
6. The masters of slaves who escape to church should always be notified to come and take them since running away is offensive and requires punishment.
 
One of the most important strides in establishing a more humane relationship towards slaves was to give them the possibility to become heirs. An heir could be their own slave, but they could also be someone else's. The social status of slaves also improved when it came to family law. A child conceived between a free mother and a slave father is free upon birth because his mother was free while giving birth, even if she was a slave when the child was conceived. It also goes the other way around, if the mother was a free woman when the child was conceived, but a slave while giving birth, the child will be a free person. In Alexius I Comnenus's novella (46th chapter of ) in the year 1095, slaves are no longer defined as things and their marriage is declared equal to the marriage of free people. Until then, slaves would get married without a church ceremony, because their owners were afraid that would make their slaves free people. The emperor declared that the church ceremony should be the same for everyone, and that without it, the marriage would be considered an obscenity. Alexius explained his decision by stating: "There is one Lord for everyone, one faith, one baptism for both slave and master, but what is the difference in faith – we do not know; therefore, all of us are slaves as well to the one that got us out of our slavery".

History
During the Nemanjić dynasty (1166–1371), the Serbian medieval state flourished in the spheres of politics, religion and culture. A large number of monasteries were built, far more than in previous centuries. The country was expanding between three seas and urban life became highly developed. Trade, mining and manufacturing were significantly expanded.  Serbia and the Nemanjić dynasty became well known and respected. The ruling family, despite becoming prosperous, was widely known for piety and religious dedication and was praised and celebrated by following generations. Formal establishment of a kingdom (1217) and religious independence (1219) came after extensive political efforts by Stefan Nemanja (founder of the dynasty) and his sons, Stefan Nemanjić (the first Serbian king) and Sava Nemanjić (the first Serbian archiepiscope). To create a lasting foundation for this independent state it was necessary to produce a legal system that established regulations for the Serbian kingdom and Serbian church. During this period, only the tsar could establish legal acts and laws, which would fill the gaps in common law. As the state developed, so did industry, and thus the legal system had to regulate various relations. Therefore, with the development of an economy, Roman Law was adopted. It is important to note that prior to the Nemanjić era, Serbia was not ruled by a tsar, so its ruler could not create a code of laws which would regulate the relations in the state and church. Serbian rulers reigned with single legal acts and decrees. In order to overcome this problem and organize the legal system after acquiring religious independence, Saint Sava finished his  in 1219.

 is inseparably connected to gaining religious independence. Saint Sava most likely brought an already written nomocanon to Nicaea, when he went there in 1219 to request independence for the Serbian church from the Patriarch of Constantinople. It is hardly believable that the patriarch would have accepted the creation of an independent Serbian church before he had seen the nomocanon book that would regulate the functioning of the new church. After that, on his way back to Serbia, Saint Sava spent a short time in Thessaloniki where he completed the nomocanon. He most likely began the work on the Serbian nomocanon in 1208 while at Mount Athos, using the Synopsis of Stephen of Ephesus; Nomocanon of John Scholasticus; Nomocanon in 14 Titles; the documents of the Ecumenical Councils, which he modified with the canonical commentaries of Aristinos and John Zonaras; local church meetings; the rules of the Holy Fathers; the law of Moses, translation of the Proheiron and the Byzantine emperors' Novellae (most were taken from Justinian's Novellae).

 was a completely new compilation of civil and religious regulations, taken from Byzantine sources, but completed and reformed by Saint Sava in order to function properly in Serbia. Beside decrees that organized the life of church, there are various norms regarding civil life, most of them were taken from the Proheiron.

It consisted of 70 chapters: six in the introduction, 44 dedicated to church law and 20 to civil law.
Despite being based on Byzantine codexes,  contained Sava's own interpretations which increased its value. Saint Sava dedicated a great number of regulations to the protection of the poor and disempowered. He also accentuated the equality of state and church which led to the acceptance of Symphonia, the orthodox theory which posits that church and state are to compliment each other.
 
Multiple transcripts were preserved until this day:

 The Serbian transcript of Ilovica dates back to 1262. It was written in the Monastery of Saint Archangel Michael (today the Monastery of Saint Archangels next to Tivat) where the headquarters of the Ze bishopric were located. It consists of 398 parchment pages and is today kept in the library of Croatian Academy of Sciences and Arts.
 The Serbian transcript of Raška dates back to 1305 in Peter's church in Ras. It is written on parchment and it contains 427 pages. It is kept in the Museum of History in Moscow.
 The Serbian transcript of Dečani was also written on parchment in 1340. It has 284 pages and is kept in the library of Dečani Monastery.
 The Serbian transcript of Pčinj dates back to 1370. Unlike the previous ones, it was written on paper. It has leather binding and consists of 305 pages. It is kept in the Serbian Academy of Science and Arts.
 The Serbian transcript of Morač is from around 1615. It consists of 347 paper pages. It is kept in the Museum of the Serbian Orthodox Church.
 The Serbian transcripts of Sarajevo and Hilandar are from the 14th century.
 The Serbian transcript of Belgrade is from the 15th century.
 The Serbian transcripts of Peć and Savina are from the 16th century.
 The Serbian Canon of John Zlokruhović is from the 17th century.
 The Serbian Nomocanon of Szentendre is from the 17th century.
 
Legal transplants of Roman-Byzantine law became the basis of Serbian medieval law and Serbia became part of European and Christian civilization. In the 13th century  was transferred to Bulgaria and from there to Russia. The last edition dates back to 1914. The first edition was found to be incorrect and the second one was printed in 1200 copies, of which some reached the Serbs. Since the 17th century the Serbs have used the Russian printed editions of Sava's . The name  was also accepted from Russia and it alludes to the church being steered by the nomocanon.

Thus, Roman-Byzantine law was brought to Eastern Europe through . In Serbia, it was considered the code of divine law and was implemented into Dušan's Code (1349 and 1354). It was the only code among Serbs during the time of the Ottoman reign.

Sud Ivana Crnojevića
The legislative tradition of the Serbian people is also to be seen in Montenegro. Just before the loss of their independence in the feudal age, between 1486 and 1490, a short codex was written. It consisted of only seven articles and it is known as Тhe Verdict of Tsar and Patriarch or The Verdict of Ivan Crnojević. It is based on the alteration of Dušan's Code from the fifteenth century. Around the beginning of the 19th century when Montenegro started developing characteristics of an independent country, Petar I Petrović-Njegoš made a Codex of 33 lines.

Codex of Podunavlje
The Codex of Podunavlje was only a draft that never gained legal power. Nevertheless, it witnesses an eternal need of Serbs to arrange state relations legally. Serbs from Srednje Podunavlje used  as a source for their own codex. This codex had 27 articles which were not labeled by numbers in the manuscript. All of the laws above were already a part of  but the articles have undergone minor or bigger alterations. It was written in the vernacular with the exception of some lines in Church Slavonic.
Pavle Šafarik got hold of the manuscript soon before leaving Novi Sad in 1831. It is now kept in his manuscript collection in National Museum of Prague.

Legacy
During the Serbian Revolution (1804) priest Mateja Nenadović established  as the code for the liberated Serbia. It was also implemented in Serbian civil code (1844). Zakonopravilo is still used in the Russian, Bulgarian, and Serbian Orthodox Churches as the highest church code.

See also
Medieval Serbian law
Serbian manuscripts
Medieval Serbian literature

References

3. Zakonopravilo

Sources

Further reading

 
 
 
 
 
 

13th century in Serbia
13th-century establishments in Serbia
Medieval legal codes of Serbia
Medieval documents of Serbia
Serbian books
Serbian manuscripts
South Slavic manuscripts
Defunct constitutions
Kingdom of Serbia (medieval)
History of the Serbian Orthodox Church
Saint Sava
Cyrillic manuscripts
1210s in law